Megalomus carpenteri is a species of brown lacewing in the family Hemerobiidae. It is found in North America.  The specific epithet carpenteri honors paleoentomologist Frank M. Carpenter for his taxonomic work on the Neuroptera.

References

Further reading

 

Hemerobiiformia
Articles created by Qbugbot
Insects described in 1997